Tiamenidine (BAN, USAN, INN, also known as thiamenidine, Hoe 440) is an imidazoline compound that shares many of the pharmacological properties of clonidine. It is a centrally-acting α2 adrenergic receptor agonist (IC50 = 9.1 nM). It also acts as an α1-adrenergic receptor agonist to a far lesser extent (IC50 = 4.85 μM). In hypertensive volunteers, like clonidine, it significantly increased sinus node recovery time and lowered cardiac output. It was marketed (as tiamenidine hydrochloride) by Sanofi-Aventis under the brand name Sundralen for the management of essential hypertension.

Synthesis

Reaction of thiourea 1 with methyl iodide gives the corresponding S-methyl analogue (2), followed by heating with ethylenediamine, completes the synthesis of tiamenidine (3).

See also 
 Clonidine
 Tizanidine

References 

Abandoned drugs
Alpha-1 adrenergic receptor agonists
Alpha-2 adrenergic receptor agonists
Antihypertensive agents
Chloroarenes
Imidazolines
Thiophenes